Heidi Sundal (born October 30, 1962 in Oslo) is a Norwegian team handball player and Olympic medalist. She received silver medals at the 1988 Summer Olympics in Seoul with the Norwegian national team, and at the 1992 Summer Olympics in Barcelona. 
Heidi Sundal played 269 games for the national team during her career, scoring 731 goals.

References

External links

1962 births
Living people
Handball players at the 1988 Summer Olympics
Handball players at the 1992 Summer Olympics
Norwegian female handball players
Olympic silver medalists for Norway
Handball players from Oslo
Olympic medalists in handball
Medalists at the 1992 Summer Olympics
Medalists at the 1988 Summer Olympics